The solar zenith angle is the zenith angle of the sun, i.e., the angle between the sun’s rays and the vertical direction. It is the complement to the solar altitude or solar elevation, which is the altitude angle or elevation angle between the sun’s rays and a horizontal plane. At solar noon, the zenith angle is at a minimum and is equal to latitude minus solar declination angle. This is the basis by which ancient mariners navigated the oceans. Solar zenith angle is normally used in combination with the solar azimuth angle to determine the position of the Sun as observed from a given location on the surface of the Earth.

Formula

where
  is the solar zenith angle
  is the solar altitude angle, 
  is the hour angle, in the local solar time.
  is the current declination of the Sun
  is the local latitude.

Derivation of the formula using the subsolar point and vector analysis 

While the formula can be derived by applying the cosine law to the zenith-pole-Sun spherical triangle, the spherical trigonometry is a relatively esoteric subject. 

By introducing the coordinates of the subsolar point and using vector analysis, the formula can be obtained straightforward without incurring the use of spherical trigonometry.

Now the cosine of the solar zenith angle, is simply the dot product of the above two vectors

So the above format is mathematically identical to the one given earlier. 

Additionally, Ref.  also derived the formula for solar azimuth angle in a similar fashion without using spherical trigonometry.

Minimum and Maximum 

If , it is polar night.

If , it is polar day.

Caveats
The calculated values are approximations due to the distinction between common/geodetic latitude and geocentric latitude. However, the two values differ by less than 12 minutes of arc, which is less than the apparent angular radius of the sun.

The formula also neglects the effect of atmospheric refraction.

Applications

Sunrise/Sunset

Sunset and sunrise occur (approximately) when the zenith angle is 90°, where the hour angle h0 satisfies

Precise times of sunset and sunrise occur when the upper limb of the Sun appears, as refracted by the atmosphere, to be on the horizon.

Albedo
A weighted daily average zenith angle, used in computing the local albedo of the Earth, is given by

where Q is the instantaneous irradiance.

Summary of special angles
For example, the solar elevation angle is :
 90° if you are on the equator, a day of equinox, at a solar hour of twelve
 near 0° at the sunset or at the sunrise
 between −90° and 0° during the night (midnight)

An exact calculation is given in position of the Sun. Other approximations exist elsewhere.

See also
 Azimuth
 Solar azimuth angle
 Horizontal coordinate system
 List of orbits
 
 Position of the Sun
 Sun path
 Sunrise
 Sunset
 Sun transit time

References

Horizontal coordinate system
Sun
Solar energy